Tardiphaga robiniae is a Gram-negative and rod-shaped bacteria from the family of Tardiphaga which has been isolated from Robinia pseudoacacia root nodules.

References
Notes

Further reading

External links
Type strain of Tardiphaga robiniae at BacDive -  the Bacterial Diversity Metadatabase

Bacteria described in 2011